White Apache is a 1986 Western film directed by Bruno Mattei. The film was an Italian and Spanish co-production between Beatrice Films and Multivideo.

Plot 

After heavy gunfire in a clash with some outlaw, a pregnant woman is the only survivor of a caravan. Found by the Indians, the woman who is dying, is brought to the village, where she died giving birth to a child.

Cast 
 Sebastian Harrison  as  Shining Sky 
 Lola Forner  as  Rising Sun 
 Alberto Farnese  as  The Governor
 Charly Bravo  as Ryder 
 Cinzia De Ponti  as  Isabella 
 Charles Borromel  as Crazy Bull 
 José Canalejas  as  White Bear 
 Luciano Pigozzi  as  Cribbens

Production
While only Mattei is credited, some sources such as Kevin Grant's book Any Gun Can Play state that Claudio Fragasso also directed the film uncredited. On discussing their collaborations on The Other Hell and The True Story of the Nuns of Monza, Fragasso stated he would shoot the film at the same time Mattei was shooting the other which was also done with their two woman in prison films Violence in a Women's Prison and Women's Prison Massacre and the Westerns Scalps and White Apache. Mattei stater otherwise, that Fragasso was an assistant director on these films, and nothing more.

Release
White Apache was first released in 1986. was released in Spain on 27 May 1987. The film was also released as Apache Kid.
In the uncut versions of both White Apache and Scalps contain scenes of scalping, dismemberment and other violence.

Reception
From retrospective reviews, in their book Dizionario del cinema italiano, Roberto Chiti and Roberto Poppi noted the film had a poor story, modest acting and was hastily directed while praised its attempt to develop characters in the story.

References

Sources

External links
 
 

1986 films
1986 Western (genre) films
Spanish Western (genre) films
Films directed by Bruno Mattei
Films scored by Luigi Ceccarelli
Spaghetti Western films
1980s Italian films